Virtual property may refer to:

 A group-theoretic property that holds virtually
 The analogue of property in a virtual economy

See also
Virtual goods